Antana is a village in the Hadoti region of Rajasthan, India. It serves as a Gram panchayat for two nearby villages: Musen Mata and Ummedganj. The nearest town is Atru, which is 8 km away. It is located 32 km from the district headquarters, Baran.

Population and literacy 
As of the 2011 census, there were a total of 365 families in Antana, comprising a total population of 1772, of which 938 were males while 834 were females.

The population of children of ages 0-6 was 216, which made up 12.19% of the total population. The average sex ratio was 889, lower than the Rajasthan state average of 928. The child sex ratio was 895, higher than the Rajasthan average of 888.

In 2011, the literacy rate was 80.46%, compared to 66.11% for Rajasthan, with male literacy at 91.50%, and female literacy at 68.03%.

Employment 

1,021 people had jobs, with 46.52% describing their work as main work (employment or more than 6 months), while the remainder were involved in marginal activity, less than 6 months.

Education 
It has a Government Senior Secondary School.

Transport 
It is well connected to Atru Tehsil and nearby villages via road. The nearest railway station is at Atru.

Healthcare facilities 
There is a primary healthcare center.

References

villages in Atru Tehsil
Villages in Baran district
Gram Panchayats and Villages in Atru Tehsil